Beautiful to Me may refer to:

"Beautiful to Me" (Little Birdy song)
"Beautiful to Me" (Olly Murs song)
"Beautiful to Me" (Shane Filan song)